Yance Ford is an African-American transgender producer and director.

Life and career
Ford graduated from Hamilton College in 1994.

Beginning in 2002 he worked as a series producer at PBS for ten years.

In 2011 he was named one of Filmmaker magazine's 25 New Faces of Independent Film. He also received the 2011–2012 Fledgling Fund Fellowship at MacDowell.

In 2017 he was #97 on The Root 100, an "annual list of the most influential African Americans, ages 25 to 45."

Strong Island and other works
In 2018, he and Joslyn Barnes were nominated for the Academy Award for Best Documentary Feature for producing and directing Strong Island. As such, he was the first openly transgender man to be nominated for any Academy Award, and the first openly transgender director to be nominated for any Academy Award. Also in 2018, he and Joslyn Barnes were awarded an Emmy for Exceptional Merit in Documentary Filmmaking for producing Strong Island, which made him the first openly transgender man and the first black openly transgender person to win an Emmy award, as well as the first openly transgender filmmaker to win a Creative Arts Emmy also for Strong Island about the murder of his brother William Ford, which occurred in 1992.

He has also received a Creative Capital Award, and a Sundance Documentary Film Program Fellowship.

Ford directed an episode of the 2020 documentary series, Trial By Media, titled "Blago!", about the media furor over the court case against Governor of Illinois Rod Blagojevich.

See also
 List of LGBT firsts by year
 List of LGBT Academy Award winners and nominees
 List of transgender film and television directors

References

External links
 

African-American film directors
American film directors
American producers
Hamilton College (New York) alumni
MacDowell Colony fellows
LGBT film directors
LGBT African Americans
LGBT people from New York (state)
Living people
Transgender men
Year of birth missing (living people)
LGBT producers
21st-century African-American people